Boree Creek  is a town in the Riverina district of New South Wales, Australia. Boree Creek is situated in the Federation Council local government area but is closer to the town of Lockhart.

Like many of the smaller towns of the Riverina, it has seen its population decline in recent years.  Boree Creek is most famous for being the home town of former Deputy Prime Minister Tim Fischer. At times when Fischer was acting as Prime Minister, his property at Boree Creek became the "seat of power" of Australia.

History

Boree Creek Post Office opened on 1 August 1884 (it was closed between 1906 and 1911).

Boree Creek is the last operating section of the mostly closed railway to Oaklands. Seasonal grain trains service the silos, the station closed to passenger services in 1975 and little trace remains.

Sports and Recreation
The Boree Creek Football Club was an Australian Rules Football club established on Saturday 20th March 1886 and "The Creekers" disbanded in 1982, after one final season in the Riverina District Football League. The club played in the Riverina & DFL - Divisions Two competition in 1983, 1984.

In 1938 the club colours were black and white.

In 1940, 16 players from the Boree Creek FC enlisted for active duty in World War Two and thus, the club therefore pulled out of The Rock & District Football Assication in late June, 1940. The club reformed in 1946 after WW2 and joined the Milbrulong Football League.

Football Premierships
Greengunyah Football Association
1906,
Lockhart & District Football Association
1907 1909 (won all games, bar one, which was drawn), 1912
Faithful & District Football Association
1926, 1927, 1932, 1937, 1938, 1939.

Peter Dawson Cup
1929

Central Riverina Football League
1953

Runners Up
Lockhart & District Football Association
1905
Faithful & District Football Association
1928, 1933, 1936

Boree Creek Races
In 1913 the Boree Creek Amateur Picnic Race Club held  their first race meeting on the private property of Mr Archibald Moffat, situated just behind the town's business centre, with the meeting making a profit of £50. It appears the annual race meeting went from 1913 to 1929.

Boree Creek Cricket Club
The Boree Cricket Club was established in the early 1900's, with an annual ball taking place in 1905 and appeared to be active up until the early 1950's.

Boree Creek Cycling Club
The Boree Creek Cycling Club was formed in 1936 but appears to have operated for two years only.

Gallery

See also
 Railway to Boree Creek

References

External links

Towns in the Riverina
Towns in New South Wales
Federation Council, New South Wales